Crumbs homolog 1 is a protein that in humans is encoded by the CRB1 gene.

This gene encodes a protein which is similar to the Drosophila crumbs protein and localizes to the inner segment of mammalian photoreceptors. In Drosophila, crumbs localizes to the stalk of the fly photoreceptor and may be a component of the molecular scaffold that controls proper development of polarity in the eye. Mutations in this gene are associated with a severe form of retinitis pigmentosa, RP12, and with Leber congenital amaurosis. Alternatively spliced transcript variants have been observed but their full-length nature has yet to be determined. One small study suggests that mutations in this gene are associated with keratoconus in patients that already have Leber's congenital amaurosis.

References

External links
  GeneReviews/NIH/NCBI/UW entry on Retinitis Pigmentosa Overview

Further reading